Diplomatic relations between the Federal Republic of Germany and the Republic of Kazakhstan were established in 1991 after Kazakhstan gained independence from the former Soviet Union. Ethnic Germans and ethnic Kazakhs have a shared history dating back to World War II when ethnic Germans living in the Volga region of Russia were relocated or imprisoned in the eastern steppe of the Soviet Union in what is today the territory of Kazakhstan. At the collapse of the former Soviet Union, about one million ethnic Germans lived in Kazakhstan.



Cultural Relations
Germany and Kazakhstan have a robust framework in place for promoting and maintaining cultural exchange and people to people ties.

Economic relations
Over 1450 companies with German capital, including joint ventures, representations of German companies and banks, are registered in Kazakhstan. Over 900 German enterprises actively operate in Kazakhstan, including Heidelberg Cement, Daimler, Volkswagen, MAN, Siemens, Knauf, RWE, Bayer, BASF, Bosch, METRO, etc.

Germany was one of the first countries to extend export credits under a bilateral arrangement to Kazakhstan in 1992 to support German manufacturers and modernize Kazakhstan's market economy.  
Bilateral trade between the two countries amounted to EUR 4 billion in 2016. The trade turnover between Kazakhstan and Germany, which experienced a decline in 2014-2016 due to the economic crisis, almost reached its pre-crisis level in 2017. The total trade between Kazakhstan and Germany in 2017 amounted to 4 billion 856 million euros, which is 81.3% of Germany's trade turnover with the Central Asian countries.

A large part of foreign investments in Kazakhstan originates from Germany. Foreign direct investments (FDI) to Kazakhstan from Germany exceeded $183 million in 2018. The FDI were directed mainly into trade, industry and renewable energy.

Diplomacy & State Affairs

Climate Diplomacy
The Green Central Asia Initiative is an initiative of the Republic of Germany to align and advance policies on climate and security in Kazakhstan and other regional nations.

State Visits
German Chancellor Angela Merkel visited Kazakhstan in 2010 where she met with President Nursultan Nazarbayev to commence a 'more dynamic partnership' with Kazakhstan. Merkel laid a wreath at the Otan Qorgaushylar Monument, an Astana monument to the fallen soldiers of the Great Patriotic War (the Eastern Front of World War II).

German President Frank-Walter Steinmeier noted in a July 2017 visit to Astana that German-Kazakh relations had grown closer and broader over the past 25 years. The German President conducted his visit to participate in the National Day of Germany at the EXPO-2017. During his visit, the German President met with his Kazakh counterpart Nursultan Nazarbayev to discuss the countries' cooperation in economy, technology and education.

See also 
 Foreign relations of Germany
 Foreign relations of Kazakhstan
 Germans of Kazakhstan

References 

 
Kazakhstan
Bilateral relations of Kazakhstan